The England cricket team toured Sri Lanka from 21 November to 16 December 2014 playing a seven-match ODI series against the Sri Lankan national cricket team. It was Sri Lanka's first seven-match ODI series played at home. Sri Lanka won the 7-match series 5–2. The series marked the final international matches that Mahela Jayawardene played in his home country and Kumar Sangakkara's final ODIs at home before their retirements after the 2015 Cricket World Cup.

Squads

Tour matches

One-day: Sri Lanka A v England XI

One-day: Sri Lanka A v England XI

ODI series

1st ODI

2nd ODI

3rd ODI

4th ODI

5th ODI

6th ODI

7th ODI

References

External links
 ESPNcricinfo

2014 in English cricket
2014 in Sri Lankan cricket
2014–15
International cricket competitions in 2014–15
Sri Lankan cricket seasons from 2000–01